April Bulmer (born 1963) is a Canadian poet whose poems have appeared in numerous literary magazines and anthologies, including Arc, the Malahat Review, Quills, and Ascent Aspirations. Her poetry has won awards from Leaf Press and the Ontario Poetry Society.

Bulmer was born in Toronto and educated at that city's York University, where she earned a Bachelor's degree in English and mass communications. She holds three Master's degrees: in creative writing from Concordia University in Montreal, in theology from Toronto's University of Trinity College and in religious studies from the University of Windsor.

Publications
1991: A Salve for Every Sore, Cormorant Books,  
1997: The Weight of Wings, Trout Lily Press, 
1999: HIM, Black Moss Press, 
2004: Oh My Goddess, Serengeti Press, 
2005: Spring Rain, Serengeti Press, 
2007: Black Blooms, Serengeti Press, 
2008: The Goddess Psalms, Serengeti Press,

References

1963 births
Living people
20th-century Canadian poets
21st-century Canadian poets
Canadian women poets
20th-century Canadian women writers
21st-century Canadian women writers